Frederik Jacobsen (12 September 1876 – 4 September 1922), was a Danish actor. He appeared in 27 films between 1911 and 1923.

Selected filmography
Vildledt Elskov (1911)
Towards the Light (1919)

External links

 Frederik Jacobsen at Danskefilm.dk

1922 deaths
Danish male film actors
Danish male silent film actors
20th-century Danish male actors
Male actors from Copenhagen
1876 births